In sociology, habitus is the way that people perceive and respond to the social world they inhabit, by way of their personal habits, skills, and disposition of character. People with a common cultural background (social class, religion, and nationality, ethnic group, education, and profession) share a habitus as the way that group culture and personal history shape the mind of a person; consequently, the habitus of a person influences and shapes the social actions of the person.

The sociologist Pierre Bourdieu said that the habitus consists of the hexis, a person's carriage (posture) and speech (accent), and the mental habits of perception and classification, of appreciation, feeling, and action. The habitus allows the individual person to figure out and resolve problems based upon gut feeling and intuition. That way of being (social attitudes, mannerisms, tastes, morality, etc.) influences the availability of opportunities in life; thus the habitus is structured by the person's social class, but also gives structure to the future paths available to the person.

Therefore, the reproduction of social structures results from the habitus of the individual persons who compose the given social structure. Moreover, the habitus is criticised for being deterministic concept, because, as social actors, people behave as automata, in the sense proposed in the Monadology of the philosopher G.W. Leibniz.

Origins 
The concept of the habitus has been used as early as Aristotle but in contemporary usage was introduced by Marcel Mauss and later Maurice Merleau-Ponty; however, it was Pierre Bourdieu who turned it into a cornerstone of his sociology, and used it to address the sociological problem of agency and structure: the habitus is shaped by structural position and generates action, thus when people act and demonstrate agency they simultaneously reflect and reproduce social structure. Bourdieu elaborated his theory of the habitus while borrowing ideas on cognitive and generative schemes from Noam Chomsky and Jean Piaget dependency on history and human memory. For instance, a certain behaviour or belief becomes part of a society's structure when the original purpose of that behaviour or belief can no longer be recalled and becomes socialized into individuals of that culture.

Loïc Wacquant wrote that habitus is an old philosophical notion, originating in the thought of Aristotle, whose notion of hexis ("state") was translated into habitus by the Medieval Scholastics.  Bourdieu first adapted the term in his 1967 postface to Erwin Panofsky's Gothic Architecture and Scholasticism.  The term was earlier used in sociology by Norbert Elias in The Civilizing Process (1939) and in Marcel Mauss's account of "body techniques".  The concept is also present in the work of Max Weber, Gilles Deleuze, and Edmund Husserl.

Mauss defined habitus as those aspects of culture that are anchored in the body or daily practices of individuals, groups, societies, and nations.  It includes the totality of learned habits, bodily skills, styles, tastes, and other non-discursive knowledges that might be said to "go without saying" for a specific group (Bourdieu 1990:66-67)—in that way it can be said to operate beneath the level of rational ideology.

According to Bourdieu, habitus is composed of:

Non-sociological uses

Literary criticism 
The term has also been adopted in literary criticism, adapting from Bourdieu's usage of the term. For example, Joe Moran's examination of authorial identities in Star Authors: Literary Celebrity in America uses the term in discussion of how authors develop a habitus formed around their own celebrity and status as authors, which manifests in their writing.

Use in literary theory 
Bourdieu's principle of habitus is interwoven with the concept of structuralism in literary theory. Peter Barry explains, "in the structuralist approach to literature there is a constant movement away from interpretation of the individual literary work and a parallel drive towards understanding the larger structures which contain them" (2009, p. 39). There is therefore a strong desire to understand the larger influencing factors which makes an individual literary work. As Bourdieu explains, habitus "are structured structures, generative principles of distinct and distinctive practices – what the worker eats, and especially the way he eats it, the sport he practices and the way he practices it, his political opinions and the way he expresses them are systematically different from the industrial proprietor's corresponding activities / habitus are also structuring structures, different classifying schemes classification principles, different principles of vision and division, different tastes. Habitus make different differences; they implement distinctions between what is good and what is bad, what is right and what is wrong, between what is distinguished and what is vulgar, and so on, but they are not the same. Thus, for instance, the same behaviour or even the same good can appear distinguished to one person, pretentious to someone else, and cheap or showy to yet another" (Bourdieu, 1996). As a result, habitus may be employed in literary theory in order to understand those larger, external structures which influence individual theories and works of literature.

Body habitus 
Body habitus (or "bodily habitus") is the medical term for physique, and is categorized as either endomorphic (relatively short and stout), ectomorphic (relatively long and thin) or mesomorphic (muscular proportions). In this sense, habitus has in the past been interpreted as the physical and constitutional characteristics of an individual, especially as related to the tendency to develop a certain disease. For example, "Marfanoid bodily habitus".

Scholars researching habitus 
 Loïc Wacquant – a sociologist and ethnographer who studied the construction of the "pugilistic habitus" in a boxing gym of the black ghetto of Chicago in Body and Soul: Notebooks of an Apprentice Boxer (2004) and in "Habitus as Topic and Tool" (2009).
 Bernard Lahire – a French sociologist who suggested that the habitus is not (or no longer) a system shared by a class, but rather an eclectic set of dispositions that are often contradictory, due to non-typical socialization paths in late modernity.
 Gabriel Ignatow explored how the notion of habitus can contribute to the sociology of morality.
 Philippe Bourgois – an anthropologist who incorporates the concept of "habitus" into much of his work with injection drug users in the San Francisco Bay Area.
 Saba Mahmood – an anthropologist who suggested that the habitus can be shaped and transformed not only through unconscious mimesis but also through pedagogic process, whole reverting from Bourdieu's account to that of Aristotle.
 Stephen Parkin – a sociologist who considers the "habitus" construct as an explanatory mechanism for the production of drug related harm in drug using environments located in public settings in "Habitus and Drug Using Environments: Health Place and Lived-Experience" (published by Ashgate in August 2013).
 Heinrich Wilhelm Schäfer – Center for the interdisciplinary research on religion and society (CIRRuS) at Bielefeld University (Germany)
 Ori Schwarz – a sociologist who studied the "sonic habitus", schemes that organize the production of sounds, their classification (e.g. as "noise") and the reaction to them.
 Loren Ludwig, US – a musicologist researching the way that instrumental chamber music allows for the cultivation and experience of habitus by its players.
 Norbert Elias – In The Civilizing Process, Elias illustrates how the habitus is determined on our culturally accepted manners. His theory is also extended to a 'national habitus' of Germans, used to justify the Holocaust.
 Dov Cohen and Hans IJzerman, who studied the habitus in social psychology, examining how Latinos and Anglos embody honor differently.
 Sudhir Chella Rajan, who shows how automobility forms a complex discursive apparatus built on fragile assumptions around individuality, autonomy, and driving and is so ideologically powerful as to constitute the very bodily disposition of liberal political theory.
 Victor J. Friedman and Israel J. Sykes likens the idea of habitus to the idea of theory-in-action developed by Chris Aryris and Donald Schön .
 William Cockerham, American medical sociologist, uses Bourdieu's habitus as a basis for his health lifestyle theory.

References

Further reading 

 Bourdieu, Pierre. 1977. Outline of a Theory of Practice. Cambridge University Press.
 Bourdieu, Pierre and Loïc J.D. Wacquant. 1992. An Invitation to Reflexive Sociology. The University of Chicago Press.
 Elias, Norbert. The Civilizing Process.
 Hilgers, Mathieu. 2009. Habitus, Freedom and Reflexivity 'Theory and Psychology' Vol. 19 (6), pp. 728–755
 MacLeod, Jay.  1995.  Ain't No Makin' It.  Colorado: Westview Press, Inc.
 Maton, Karl. 2012 'Habitus', in Grenfell, M. (ed) Pierre Bourdieu: Key concepts. London: Acumen Press, revised edition.
 Mauss, Marcel. 1934. "Les Techniques du corps", Journal de Psychologie 32 (3-4). Reprinted in Mauss, Sociologie et anthropologie, 1936, Paris: PUF.
 Rimmer. Mark. 2010. Listening to the monkey: Class, youth and the formation of a musical habitus 'Ethnography' Vol. 11 (2), pp. 255–283
 Wacquant, Loïc. 2004. Body and Soul. Oxford: Oxford University Press.
 Wacquant, Loïc. 2004. "Habitus." pp. 315–319 in International Encyclopedia of Economic Sociology. Edited by Jens Beckert and Milan Zafirovski. London: Routledge.

Social concepts
Political concepts
Post-structuralism
Sociological terminology
Social agreement

he:הביטוס
te:అలవాటు